Víctoria Casas is a Mexican former swimmer. She competed in two events at the 1968 Summer Olympics.

References

Year of birth missing (living people)
Living people
Mexican female swimmers
Olympic swimmers of Mexico
Swimmers at the 1968 Summer Olympics
Swimmers at the 1967 Pan American Games
Pan American Games competitors for Mexico
Place of birth missing (living people)
20th-century Mexican women